Live from Los Angeles is an album by American jazz composer/arranger Oliver Nelson featuring performances recorded in 1967 for the Impulse! label.

Reception

The initial Billboard magazine review from February 1968 wrote that:  The Allmusic review by Douglas Payne awarded the album 2 stars stating:

Track listing
All compositions by Oliver Nelson except as indicated
 "Miss Fine" – 4:13
 "Milestones" (Miles Davis) – 8:32
 "I Remember Bird" (Leonard Feather) – 5:40
 "Night Train" (Jimmy Forrest, Lewis P. Simpkins, Oscar Washington) – 4:49
 "Guitar Blues" – 4:21
 "Down by the Riverside" – 8:49
 "Ja-Da" (Bob Carleton) – 2:13
Recorded at Marty's On The Hill in Los Angeles, California on June 2, 1967 (track 1), June 3, 1967 (track 2) and June 4, 1967 (tracks 3-7).

Personnel
 Oliver Nelson – soprano saxophone, arranger, conductor
 Buddy Childers, Bobby Bryant, Freddy Hill, Conte Candoli – trumpet
 Billy Byers, Pete Myers, Lou Blackburn, Ernie Tack – trombone
 Frank Strozier, Gabe Baltazar – alto saxophone
 Tom Scott, Bill Perkins – tenor saxophone
 Jack Nimitz – baritone saxophone
 Frank Strazzeri – piano
 Mel Brown – guitar (tracks 4 & 5)
 Monty Budwig – bass
 Ed Thigpen – drums

References

1967 live albums
Albums arranged by Oliver Nelson
Albums conducted by Oliver Nelson
Albums produced by Bob Thiele
Impulse! Records live albums
Oliver Nelson live albums